Paula López (born ) is a Mexican female volleyball player. She is part of the Mexico women's national volleyball team.

She participated in the 2015 FIVB Volleyball World Grand Prix.
On club level she played for Coahuila in 2015.

References

1991 births
Living people
Mexican women's volleyball players
Place of birth missing (living people)